Happold is a surname, and may refer to:

 Buro Happold, British engineering consultancy firm
 David Happold (b. 1936), British-Australian mammalogist
 Edmund Happold (1930–1996), British structural engineer
 Frederick Crossfield Happold (1893–1971), British educational pioneer and author
 Tom Happold (contemporary), journalist at Guardian Unlimited